Sinan Osmanoğlu (born 9 January 1990) is a Turkish football player who plays as a centre back for TFF First League club Çaykur Rizespor.

Professional career
Osmanoğlu is a youth product of Galatasaray and Küçükçekmecespor. He began his senior career on 28 June 2011 with Galatasaray, going on loan with Bayrampaşaspor in the TFF Third League. He transferred permanently to Altınordu in the summer of 2012, and spent 5 seasons with them and helped them earn promotion twice from the TFF Third League to the TFF Second League. On 10 July 2017, he transferred to Gaziantep for one year. He again returned to Altınordu the following season, where he stayed for three more seasons. He transferred to Ankaragücü in June 2021. On his debut season with them, he helped them win the 2021–22 TFF First League. On 8 June 2022 he extended his contract with Ankaragücü for one more year as they prepared to play in the 2022-23 Süper Lig.

International career
Osmanoğlu is a former youth international for Turkey, having played for the Turkey U18s and U19s.

Honours
Altınordu 
 TFF Third League: 2012–13
 TFF Second League: 2013–14

Ankaragücü
 TFF First League: 2021–22

References

External links
 
 

1990 births
Living people
People from Fatih
Footballers from Istanbul
Turkish footballers
Turkey youth international footballers
Galatasaray S.K. footballers
Altınordu F.K. players
Gaziantep F.K. footballers
MKE Ankaragücü footballers
Çaykur Rizespor footballers
Süper Lig players
TFF First League players
TFF Second League players
TFF Third League players
Association football defenders